Agathis zamunerae is an extinct species of tree in the genus Agathis from the Early and Middle Eocene rainforest paleofloras of the Ligorio Márquez and Ventana Formations, Patagonia, Argentina. The genus existed roughly from 52.2 to 47.75 million years ego.

References

Bibliography

Further reading 
 

zamunerae
Eocene plants
Eocene life of South America
Eocene Argentina
Fossils of Argentina
Neuquén Basin
Fossil taxa described in 2014